Michael Wayne Huff, II (born March 6, 1983) is a former American football safety.  He last played for the Denver Broncos of the National Football League (NFL). He played college football for the University of Texas, and was recognized as a consensus All-American and the top college defensive back.  He was drafted by the Oakland Raiders with the seventh overall pick in the 2006 NFL Draft, and has played for the NFL's Baltimore Ravens and Denver Broncos.

Early years
Huff was born in Irving, Texas.  He attended Nimitz High School in Irving, and was a three-year letterman in football and a four-year letterman in track. In football, he played wide receiver, cornerback, and safety, contributed in the playoffs his freshmen and junior years. His football jersey No. 23 was retired by Nimitz High School. Huff was inducted into the Irving Independent School District Hall of Fame Class in 2013.

College career

Football
Huff attended the University of Texas at Austin, where he played for coach Mack Brown's Texas Longhorns football team from 2001 to 2005.  He was recognized as a unanimous first-team All-American in 2005 and won the Jim Thorpe Award as the nation's best defensive back. In 2002, he earned a third-team Freshman All-American selection from the Sporting News. He had four career interceptions returned for touchdowns, a school record. In the Rose Bowl game against the USC Trojans, Huff recovered a fumbled lateral from Reggie Bush, a play that many credit with changing the momentum of the game and helping the 2005 Texas Longhorns football team win the NCAA National Championship. He also was the key defender who prevented USC running back LenDale White from gaining a first down on a crucial fourth-down-and-two with USC leading late in the 4th quarter.

Track and field
Huff also ran track and field at the University of Texas at Austin, where he recorded personal bests of 6.67 seconds in the 60 meters and 10.13 seconds in the 100 meters.

Personal bests

Professional career

Oakland Raiders

2006 season
Michael Huff was selected in the 1st round (7th overall) by the Oakland Raiders in the 2006 NFL Draft. After immediately being named the starter at strong safety in his rookie year, he recorded 78 tackles. On October 22, 2006, in a game against the Arizona Cardinals, Huff recorded 4 solo tackles and his first safety. He started all 16 games in his rookie season.

2007 season
His first forced fumble came in his second year in a match-up against the Houston Texans on November 11, 2007. His first interception came in a game against rivalry team Kansas City Chiefs, which set up kicker Sebastian Janikowski for the field goal, which led to a victory 20-17. Huff ended the game with an impressive performance, adding in 9 total tackles (7 solo, 2 assists). The following week, against another rival team, the Denver Broncos, Huff sacked Broncos Quarterback Jay Cutler. Huff finished his 2007 season with 85 tackles, 1 forced fumble and 1 interception.

Huff was moved to free safety after the acquisition of Gibril Wilson.

2008 season
After recording just 12 tackles through the first 5 games of the 2008 season, Michael Huff was benched from his free safety position in favor of Hiram Eugene.

2009 season
At the start of the 2009 season, Oakland had Hiram Eugene and Huff splitting snaps. Huff displayed excellent ball skills in the first two weeks, intercepting 3 passes. Huff finished the season with 59 tackles, half a sack and 3 interceptions, playing next to strong safety Tyvon Branch.

2010 season
Huff opened the 2010 season as the Raiders starting free safety, still playing next to Tyvon Branch. The 2010 season would be the Raiders best season at 8-8 since losing Super Bowl XXXVII to the Tampa Bay Buccaneers in the 2002 NFL season. For the second straight year, Huff finished with 3 interceptions, along with career highs in almost every defensive category on his way to his first All-Pro section, he was selected as a 2nd team All-Pro. Huff finished the season with 94 tackles, 4 sacks, 3 forced fumbles, and 3 interceptions.

2011 season
On opening day of the 2011 NFL season, he was still the starting free safety playing next to Tyvon Branch in a win over the Denver Broncos.

On October 9, 2011 against the Houston Texans, Huff intercepted his first pass of the year in the endzone with no time remaining to ensure victory for the Raiders. This was one day after the passing of the Raiders long-time owner Al Davis. On the play the raiders defense only had 10 men on the field. Huff said that Davis “had his hand on that ball.”

2012 season
Huff once again started the 2012 season at free safety for the Raiders. However, injuries to starting cornerbacks Ron Bartell and Shawntae Spencer forced the team to move Huff to cornerback before Oakland's week 3 victory against the Pittsburgh Steelers.

Huff was cut by the Oakland Raiders on March 12, 2013.

Baltimore Ravens

2013 season
On March 27, 2013 Huff agreed to terms with the Baltimore Ravens on a three-year deal worth $6 million.
On October 30, 2013 Huff was released by the Baltimore Ravens.

Denver Broncos
On November 19, 2013 Huff was signed by the Denver Broncos.

NFL career statistics

Coaching career

Texas
Huff has joined the newly formed staff at University of Texas at Austin joining newly named Tom Herman in his first coaching role. He will be a Quality Control Coach, serving as Assistant Defensive Backs Coach.

See also
List of Texas Longhorns football All-Americans
List of Oakland Raiders first-round draft picks

References

External links

 Michael Huff's Official Website
 Oakland Raiders bio
 Michael Huff profile on ESPN.com
 Michael Huff profile at Mack Brown Texas Football

1983 births
Living people
All-American college football players
American football safeties
Baltimore Ravens players
Denver Broncos players
Oakland Raiders players
People from Irving, Texas
Players of American football from Texas
Sportspeople from the Dallas–Fort Worth metroplex
Texas Longhorns football players